Rhexius is a genus of ant-loving beetles in the family Staphylinidae. There are about 6 described species in Rhexius.

Species
 Rhexius ferrugineus Casey, 1908
 Rhexius insculptus LeConte, 1849
 Rhexius ouachita Chandler, 1990
 Rhexius schmitti Brendel, 1893
 Rhexius stephani Chandler, 1990
 Rhexius substriatus LeConte, 1878

References

 Chandler, Donald S. (1997). "Family: Pselaphidae". A Catalog of the Coleoptera of America North of Mexico, ix + 118.
 Newton, Alfred F. Jr., and Donald S. Chandler (1989). "World Catalog of the Genera of Pselaphidae (Coleoptera)". Fieldiana: Zoology, New Series, no. 53, iv + 93.

Further reading

 Arnett, R.H. Jr., M. C. Thomas, P. E. Skelley and J. H. Frank. (eds.). (2002). American Beetles, Volume II: Polyphaga: Scarabaeoidea through Curculionoidea. CRC Press LLC, Boca Raton, FL.
 Arnett, Ross H. (2000). American Insects: A Handbook of the Insects of America North of Mexico. CRC Press.
 Richard E. White. (1983). Peterson Field Guides: Beetles. Houghton Mifflin Company.

External links

 NCBI Taxonomy Browser, Rhexius

Pselaphinae genera